The COVID-19 pandemic reached the province of Shaanxi, China.

Statistics

Timeline

2020

On the evening of January 24, the Shaanxi Provincial Health Committee reported that there were 2 new confirmed cases of pneumonia caused by a new type of coronavirus in Shaanxi, including 1 in Ankang City and 1 in Yan'an City.

On January 25, Shaanxi Province reported 10 new cases. One of the patients was a 9-year-old girl from Wuhan. She visited relatives in Tongchuan City on Monday. She developed symptoms the next day and went to the hospital for medical treatment after self-medication was ineffective. She is currently in the local infectious disease hospital. Isolation treatment, stable condition.

On January 27, Shaanxi Province notified 13 new confirmed cases of new pneumonia and 2 new severe patients.

On January 28, Shaanxi Province reported 11 new confirmed cases of new pneumonia. Among the newly confirmed cases, there were 3 cases in Xi'an City, 3 cases in Baoji City, 2 cases in Weinan City, 1 case in Hanzhong City, 1 case in Ankang City, and 1 case in Shangluo City. 1 case.

On January 29, Shaanxi Province reported 10 new confirmed cases of new pneumonia. Among the newly confirmed cases, there were 3 cases in Xi'an City, 1 case in Baoji City, 1 case in Xianyang City, 1 case in Yan'an City, 2 cases in Hanzhong City, and 2 cases in Ankang City. 2 cases.

On January 30, Shaanxi Province reported 7 new confirmed cases of new pneumonia and 1 new severe patient. Among the newly confirmed cases, 4 were in Xi'an, 1 in Weinan, 1 in Yulin, and 1 in Hancheng.

On January 31, Shaanxi Province notified 24 new confirmed cases of new pneumonia. Among the newly confirmed cases, 10 were in Xi'an, 1 in Xianyang, 1 in Weinan, 4 in Yan'an, 5 in Hanzhong, and 3 in Ankang.

2021
On January 1, 1 newly imported confirmed case was reported (from Spain).

2022
On January 1, 123 local confirmed cases were newly reported in Shaanxi Province (122 in Xi'an City, 1 in Yan'an City), and 1 case was cured and discharged.

References

COVID-19 pandemic in China by province
COVID-19 pandemic in mainland China
History of Shaanxi
Health in Shaanxi
zh:2019冠状病毒病陕西省疫情